The 1977–78 Football League Cup was the 18th season of the Football League Cup, a knockout competition for England's top 92 football clubs. The competition started on 13 August 1977 and ended with the final going to a replay on 22 March 1978.

The final was contested by First Division teams Nottingham Forest and Liverpool at Wembley Stadium in London, followed by a replay at Old Trafford.

First round

First Leg

Second Leg

Replays

Second round

Ties

Replays

2nd Replay

Third round

Ties

Replays

2nd Replay

Fourth round

Ties

Replay

Fifth Round

Ties

Replay

Semi-finals

First Leg

Second Leg

Final

Match Details

Replay

References

General

Specific

EFL Cup seasons
1977–78 domestic association football cups
Lea
Cup